Bharatiya Janata Party, Rajasthan (or BJP Rajasthan) is a state unit of the Bharatiya Janata Party in Rajasthan. Satish Poonia is the current president of the BJP Rajasthan. Vasundhara Raje was the previous Chief Minister of Rajasthan during 2013–2018,
previously she served in the same post from 2003 to 2008. She was the first female Chief Minister of Rajasthan. And the former president of the BJP Rajasthan.

History

Bharatiya Jana Sangh [1951-77] 
The roots of the Bharatiya Janata Party in Rajasthan dates back to the times of its predecessor Bharatiya Jana Sangh which was traditionally strong in some pockets of Rajasthan. Of the 3 seats which the BJS had won in the 1951–52 Indian general election, one of the seat was Chittorgarh (Lok Sabha constituency) won by Umashankar Muljibhai Trivedi. The elections held to the Rajasthan Legislative Assembly in 1952 witnessed the BJS winning 8 seats out of the 50 seats it had contested and had garnered 5.93% of the votes polled. However the tally of the BJS fell in the subsequent election as Ram Rajya Parishad led by Swami Karpatri too contested the elections and the vote division took place. However, in the subsequent elections of 1962 and 1967 the BJS won 15 and 22 seats respectively crossing vote share of 10%. In the 1972 elections despite maintaining the vote share the BJS could win only 8 seats.

Janata Party [1977-80] 
In 1975, Indira Gandhi declared a state of Emergency, and threw many major opposition politicians in jail including the leaders of the BJS. In 1977, the Emergency was withdrawn, and elections were held. The BJS, joined forces with the Bharatiya Lok Dal, the Congress (O), and the Socialist Party, to form the Janata Party. The elections saw Janata Party emerging victorious in 152/200 seats in the Assembly. As the Jan Sangh faction was the largest in the legislative party, its leader Bhairon Singh Shekhawat became the first non-Congress Chief Minister of Rajasthan. However the government began to wither as significant ideological and political divisions emerged. The party consisted of veteran socialists, trade unionists and pro-business leaders, making major reforms difficult to achieve without triggering a divide. Socialist politicians shared an aversion to the Hindu nationalist agenda of the Rashtriya Swayamsevak Sangh, whose members included Vajpayee, Advani and other leaders from the former Bharatiya Jana Sangh. The party thereafter split and Indira Gandhi emerged victorious in the 1980 Indian general election and came back to power. The Janata Party government led by Bhairon Singh Shekhawat was dismissed on the grounds that the Government had lost the public trust.

Bharatiya Janata Party [1980- present] 
In April 1980, shortly after the elections, the National Executive Council of the Janata Party banned its members from being 'dual members' of party and the RSS. In response, the former Jana Sangh members left to create a new political party, known as the Bharatiya Janata Party. Although the newly formed BJP was technically distinct from the Jana Sangh, the bulk of its rank and file were identical to its predecessor which helped the BJP in retaining some of its traditional Jan Sangh vote base. The BJP emerged as the principal opposition to the ruling Congress both the times in 1980 as well as 1985.

The allegations of corruption, known as the Bofors scandal, against Rajiv Gandhi witnessed the Congress party's defeat in 1989 Indian general election. The National Front coalition was formed with the outside support from the Left Front and the Bharatiya Janata Party and V. P. Singh became the prime minister. The Congress subsequently even lost the 1990 Rajasthan elections to the BJP. The BJP with 85 seats formed a coalition with the Janata Dal which had 55 seats and Bhairon Singh Shekhawat became the first Chief Minister from the Bharatiya Janata Party on 4 March 1990.

On 6 December 1992, Babri Masjid was demolished in Uttar Pradesh and Kalyan Singh, the then Chief Minister of Uttar Pradesh took the moral responsibility and resigned. The state was put under President's rule. However P. V. Narasimha Rao, the then Prime Minister undemocratically dismissed the BJP ruled state Governments in Rajasthan, Madhya Pradesh, Himachal Pradesh due to violence erupted in these states with the fall of the Masjid, while the Congress Government in Maharashtra was spared despite Bombay riots and 1993 Bombay bombings.

While the BJP lost subsequent elections held in 1993 to Uttar Pradesh, Madhya Pradesh and Himachal Pradesh, it was able to win a wafer thin majority in Rajasthan and managed to form a Government with support of independents under Bhairon Singh Shekhawat. The BJP however lost 1998 state elections to the Congress led by Ashok Gehlot and was reduced to 33 seats in the Assembly of 200 seats. Thereafter the power has been alternating between the BJP and the Congress once in every 5 years.

Support base 
For many years, the BJP support base was mainly Rajput due to the fact that the BJP was led by Bhairon Singh Shekhawat and the disillusionment of Rajputs with the Congress due to the land reforms undertaken by the Congress Government due to which large number of tillers, with the new act, became land owners while the jagirdars who were mainly Rajputs became dispossessed of their lands. The Brahmins largely remained with the Congress till early 90's. However, they shifted to the BJP after Mandal Commission and Ram Janmabhoomi movement.

Over the years, the BJP has been able to garner a section of Jat's who were traditionally Congress voters as Atal Bihari Vajpayee had announced reservation for the Jats in Rajasthan. The Jats also resented the fact that in spite of Jat's voting Congress in 1998 state elections, Parasram Maderna, a Jat leader was not made the Chief Minister in favour of Ashok Gehlot, a non-Jat. Besides, the projection of Vasundhara Raje as Jat ki Bahu (daughter-in-law of Jat) also helped the BJP to garner Jat votes and cross the majority mark in 2003 state elections, a feat which even the party patriarch Bhairon Singh Shekhawat couldn't achieve.

Electoral Performance

Legislative Assembly elections

Lok Sabha elections

Leadership

List of chief ministers

List of deputy chief ministers

List of Presidents 

Source:

State-level organisations
 Peasants: BJP Kisan Morcha, Rajasthan 
 Women: BJP Mahila Morcha, Rajasthan
 Youth: Bharatiya Janata Yuva Morcha, Rajasthan

See also
 Bharatiya Janata Party, Gujarat
 Bharatiya Janata Party, Uttar Pradesh
 Bharatiya Janata Party, Madhya Pradesh
 State units of the Bharatiya Janata Party

References

External links
 Official website

Rajasthan
Politics of Rajasthan